Miłosz Kozak (born 23 May 1997) is a Polish professional footballer who plays as a winger for Polish club Górnik Łęczna. His sister Kinga plays for Glasgow City and the Poland women's national team.

Honours
Radomiak Radom
I liga: 2020–21

Spartak Trnava
Slovak Cup: 2021–22

References

External links

1997 births
Living people
Polish footballers
Lech Poznań players
Legia Warsaw players
Legia Warsaw II players
Zagłębie Sosnowiec players
Wigry Suwałki players
Podbeskidzie Bielsko-Biała players
Chrobry Głogów players
Radomiak Radom players
FC Spartak Trnava players
Górnik Łęczna players
Ekstraklasa players
I liga players
II liga players
III liga players
Slovak Super Liga players
Polish expatriate footballers
Expatriate footballers in Slovakia
Polish expatriate sportspeople in Slovakia
Association football midfielders